Lina Boussaha (born 16 January 1999) is a French professional footballer who plays as a midfielder for Saudi Women's Premier League club Al Nassr.

Club career
A youth academy graduate of Paris Saint-Germain, Boussaha made her professional debut for the club on 9 October 2016 in a 3–0 league win against Metz.

On 10 July 2018, Boussaha joined Lille on a season long loan deal. She scored her first senior career goal on 30 September 2018 in a 1–1 draw against her parent club PSG. She also scored goals in the quarter-final and semi-final of Coupe de France féminine, which helped the club to reach their first ever cup final.

On 19 December 2022, Saudi club Al Nassr announced the signing of Boussaha. She scored two goals from four matches during 2022–23 season and helped her team to become the first ever Saudi Women's Premier League champions.

International career
Boussaha is a former French youth international and was part of the France under-19 team which reached the final of 2017 UEFA Women's Under-19 Championship.

Personal life
Boussaha is of Algerian descent.

Career statistics

Honours
Paris Saint-Germain
 Coupe de France: 2017–18

Al Nassr
 Saudi Women's Premier League: 2022–23

France U19
 UEFA Women's Under-19 Championship runner-up: 2017

References

External links
 
 

1999 births
Living people
French sportspeople of Algerian descent
French women's footballers
France women's youth international footballers
Women's association football midfielders
Sportspeople from Saint-Denis, Seine-Saint-Denis
Paris Saint-Germain Féminine players
Division 1 Féminine players
Lille OSC (women) players
Le Havre AC (women) players
Footballers from Seine-Saint-Denis
Saudi Women's Premier League players